Raymond Maffiolo (born 6 March 1938) is a Swiss former footballer who played as a right-back. He made seven appearances for the Switzerland national team from 1963 to 1965.

References

External links
 

1938 births
Living people
Swiss men's footballers
Association football fullbacks
Switzerland international footballers
Swiss Super League players
Servette FC players
Place of birth missing (living people)